Cella is an Italian surname. Notable people with the surname include:

 Bernhard Cella (born 1969), Austrian artist
 Elisa Cella (born 1982), Italian volleyball player
 Ettore Cella (1913–2004), Swiss film director
 Giancarlo Cella (born 1940), Italian footballer
 Joseph Cella (born 1969), American diplomat
 Len Cella (born 1937), American filmmaker

See also
 Cela (surname)
 Cello
 Celle

Surnames of Italian origin